Nowgong can refer to:
 Naogaon District, Bangladesh
 Nagaon, a city in Nagaon district, Assam, India
 Nowgong (Lok Sabha constituency)
 Nowgong, Chhatarpur, a city and former military center, Chattarpur District, Madhya Pradesh, India